"Wasted on You" (Evanescence song)
"Wasted on You" (Morgan Wallen song)